Oswald Lewis (28 February 1833 – 28 April 1895) was an Australian cricketer. He played four first-class matches for New South Wales between 1856/57 and 1860/61.

See also
 List of New South Wales representative cricketers

References

External links
 
 

1833 births
1895 deaths
Australian cricketers
New South Wales cricketers
Cricketers from Sydney